Crescenzio Rinaldini (December 27, 1925 – October 24, 2011) was the Roman Catholic bishop of the Roman Catholic Diocese of Araçuaí, Brazil.

Ordained in 1949, he became a bishop in 1982 retiring in 2001.

Notes

20th-century Roman Catholic bishops in Brazil
1925 births
2011 deaths
Roman Catholic bishops of Araçuaí